The 1910 Cork Intermediate Hurling Championship was the second staging of the Cork Intermediate Hurling Championship since its establishment by the Cork County Board.

Aghabullogue won the championship following a 3-2 to 2-0 defeat of Shamrocks in the final.

Results

Final

References

Cork Intermediate Hurling Championship
Cork Intermediate Hurling Championship